Robert Wales was a Scottish writer who worked for a number of years in Australia.

Select Credits
The Grotto (1962) – radio play
The Cell (1966) – play – adapted for TV by the ABC in 1968
Bullseye (1987) – film
Harry (1985) – novel

References

External links
The Cell at AustLit
Robert Wales at AustLit
Robert Wales productions at AusStage

Australian male novelists
Possibly living people
Australian screenwriters